Nikola Pavlović (born 13 May 1996) is a Serbian professional basketball player for KK Teodo of the Montenegrin Prva A Liga. He is playing as a power forward.

External links 
 Profile at abaliga.com
 Profile at eurobasket.com
 Profile at FIBA

1996 births
Living people
Basketball League of Serbia players
KKK Radnički players
KK Vršac players
KK Mega Basket players
KK Smederevo players
KK Zlatibor players
Sportspeople from Kraljevo
Serbian expatriate basketball people in Montenegro
Serbian expatriate basketball people in North Macedonia
Serbian men's basketball players
Power forwards (basketball)